Ice Exercise was a United States Navy mission in the Arctic Ocean.

On March 2, 2016, the United States Navy set course bound for the Arctic region. Roughly two weeks later two Los Angeles-Class Submarines arrived at US Navy Ice Camp Sargo, which is a temporary camp stationed on top of a floating ice sheet. Their objective was to carry out the US Navy’s Ice X exercise to evaluate the readiness of the Navy’s submarine force and pursue further interest into scientific fields of the Arctic region. The 2016 ICE X took place over a five-week period and included over 200 participants from the four nations: the United States, Canada, United Kingdom, and Norway. The Arctic Submarine Laboratory will also be participating. The Arctic Submarine Laboratory is responsible for the construction of Camp SARGO, conducting tests and evaluations under Arctic operations, and acts as a liaison between the civilian science community and submarine operations.

The submarines will conduct Arctic transits in which they will surface and break the ice (usually 60–90 cm or 2–3 feet thick), collect data, and run other training exercise to gain experience working in this region. The United States' first ICE X exercise in which a submarine surfaced and broke the ice was in 1958. Since then, the United States has conducted more than 26 Arctic exercises, including the Ice Exercise 2009. The importance of this exercise is that “the submarine operations to the North Pole provides the required training broaden our knowledge of an extremely challenging region that is very different than any other ocean in the world," said Cmdr. Scott Luers. Other than collecting data and training in this region the ICE X exercise also shows the US Navy's Arctic defense capabilities and readiness for roles in this region, increases the experience of sailing and working in the  area, and gathering broader knowledge about this region.

US interest in the Arctic

The interest of the US Navy in the Arctic Ocean is increasing because Alaska's coastline is over 1600 km/1000 miles long, and the Arctic ice cap is melting. As trade routes begin to open and accessibility to these waters is created the US Navy has a responsibility to defend the United States' Exclusive Economic Zone and secure national interests and resources. The US Exclusive Economic Zone is guaranteed by international law which states that nations have economic rights to resources within 370 km or 200 nautical miles of the coast. As the Arctic ice cap continues to decrease in size, the availability of open water which had been unreachable has opened up and thus created and established the  Arctic policy of the United States.

In 2013 President Obama published the National Strategy for the Arctic Region, "defining the desired end state as an Arctic Region stable and free of conflict, where nations act responsibly in a spirit of trust and cooperation, and where economic and energy resources are developed in a sustainable manner." Also in 2013, the Secretary of Defense published the Department of Defense Arctic Strategy, which named the two objectives of establishing security and being prepared for a wide range of challenges that the region poses.

The United States has established a three-part policy of near future (to 2020), mid-term (2020–2030), and far term (beyond 2030) to create realistic goals and expectations for this region and its future. Surface ships of the United States Navy do not have as much experience operating as its submarines, but with exercises such as IceX the navy’s surface ship can increase their capabilities in this region.

Future in the Arctic

The future use of this region for shipping lanes or sources of natural resources depends on the availability of open water which is increasing year to year. The Arctic Ocean of the coast of Alaska is believed to have vast hydrocarbon and other natural resources. As a result of the Arctic region warming up faster than other regions of the globe, the Arctic ice cap in 2012 reached its smallest extent in history. As passageways become available, maritime activity is likely to increase along the Northern Sea Route, especially in the Chukchi Sea in northeast Alaska, and along the Bering Strait.

The shorter route offers a fuel-saving option to maritime companies. The Northern Sea Route, which goes from northeastern Asia north over Russia to Rotterdam, is 40 percent shorter than the traditional route through the Suez Canal. Other trade routes which could increase in the region are the Northwest Passage, along the northern coast of Canada, and the Transpolar Sea Route, which goes directly through the Arctic. However, the availability of these routes depends on the amount of ice formations present in the summer time.

With the trend of increasing routes through the north, but with limitations due to winter weather and ice caps, this region is expected to see only about two percent of the world maritime trade. Countries with exclusive economic interest in this region seek to preserve a peaceful and safe environment in this region when it comes to territorial claims and commercial development. The Arctic Council, which seeks to promote stability in the region, consists of the following eight countries which have economical interest in the region: the United States, Canada, Russia, Denmark (by means of Greenland), Iceland, Norway, Sweden, and Finland.

References

Military in the Arctic
2016 in military history
2016 in the United States